Cherykaw District (Cherikovsky raion) is a raion (district) in Mogilev Region, Belarus, the administrative center is the town of Cherykaw. As of 2009, its population was 14,875. Population of Cherykaw accounts for 55.0% of the district's population.

References

 
Districts of Mogilev Region